The 1st Kansas Colored Infantry Regiment was an infantry regiment that served in the Union Army during the American Civil War. It was the first black regiment to be organized in a northern state and the first black unit to see combat during the Civil War. At the Battle of Poison Spring, the regiment lost nearly half its number, and suffered the highest losses of any Kansas regiment during the war.

Service
The 1st Kansas Infantry (Colored) was organized by the work of Senator James Henry Lane at Fort Scott, Kansas and mustered in as a battalion of six companies on January 13, 1863 for three years. Four additional companies were recruited and mustered in between January 13 and May 2, 1863. It mustered in under the command of Colonel James Monroe Williams.

The regiment was recruited without federal authorization and against the wishes of Secretary of War Edwin M. Stanton. James H. Lane, recruiting commissioner for Kansas territory north of the Kansas River, on August 4, 1862, authorized raising the regiment. Recruiting officials enlisted black men across eastern Kansas, most of whom were formerly enslaved in Missouri. Some were emancipated, and many had escaped to freedom. It was the first African-American regiment to see combat during the Civil War, in the skirmish at Island Mound, in Bates County, Missouri, in October 1862. The regiment's Company D had three black officers, William D. Matthews and his two lieutenants, Henry Copeland and Patrick Minor, who were not allowed commissions as officers when the regiment was formally mustered into the Union army.

The regiment was attached to Department of Kansas to June 1863. District of the Frontier, Department of Missouri, to January 1864. Unattached, District of the Frontier, VII Corps, Department of Arkansas, to March 1864. 2nd Brigade, District of the Frontier, VII Corps, to December 1864.

Maj. Gen. James G. Blunt, commander of the Union forces at the Battle of Honey Springs was particularly impressed by the performance of the 1st Kansas Colored Infantry at that engagement. They repulsed a Confederate charge, inflicting many casualties, and, after Colonel Williams was badly wounded, continued to fight and made an orderly withdrawal. Afterwards, he wrote: "I never saw such fighting as was done by the Negro regiment....The question that negroes will fight is settled; besides they make better soldiers in every respect than any troops I have ever had under my command."

The 1st Kansas Colored Infantry ceased to exist on December 13, 1864, when it became a U.S. Army unit and its designation was changed to the 79th Regiment Infantry U.S. Colored Troops. Also attached to the regiment at some point was Armstrong's Battery Light Artillery, a unit for which few details are known.

Detailed service
Duty in the Department of Kansas October 1862, to June 1863. Action at Island Mound, Missouri, October 27, 1862. Island Mound, Kansas, October 29. Butler, Missouri, November 28. Ordered to Baxter Springs April 1863. Scout from Creek Agency to Jasper County, Missouri, May 16–19 (detachment). Sherwood, Missouri, May 18. Bush Creek May 24. Near Fort Gibson May 28. Shawneetown, Kansas, June 6 (detachment). March to Fort Gibson, Cherokee Nation, June 27-July 5, with supply train. Action at Cabin Creek July 1–2. the Battle of Honey Springs, July 17. At Fort Gibson until September. Lawrence, Kansas, July 27 (detachment). Near Sherwood August 14 Moved to Fort Smith, Arkansas, October, then to Roseville December, and duty there until March 1864. Horse Head Creek February 12, 1864. Roseville Creek March 20. Steele's Camden Expedition March 23-May 3. Prairie D'Ann April 9–12. Poison Springs April 18. Jenkins' Ferry April 30. March to Fort Smith, Arkansas, May 3–16, and duty there until December. Fort Gibson, September 16. Cabin Creek September 19. Timber Hill November 19.

Casualties
The regiment lost at least 344 men during service; 5 officers and 173 enlisted men were killed or mortally wounded, 1 officer and 165 enlisted men died of disease. No other Kansas regiment lost more men than the 1st Kansas Colored Volunteer Infantry.

Commanders
Colonel James Monroe Williams

In popular culture
In 2011, quilt artist and educator Marla Jackson worked with junior high students in Lawrence, Kansas, to produce a collaborative and commemorative quilt on the topic of the 1st Kansas Infantry. The quilt, along with several others by Jackson that evoked similar themes, was displayed at the Spencer Museum of Art.

See also

List of Kansas Civil War Units
Skirmish at Island Mound
Kansas in the Civil War

Notes

References
Dyer, Frederick H. A Compendium of the War of the Rebellion (Des Moines, IA: Dyer Pub. Co.), 1908.
Official Military History of Kansas Regiments During the War for the Suppression of the Great Rebellion (Leavenworth: W. S. Burke), 1870.
 Spurgeon, Ian Michael. Soldiers in the Army of Freedom: The 1st Kansas Colored, the Civil War's First African American Combat Unit (Norman, OK: University of Oklahoma Press), 2014.
Attribution

External links
History of the 1st Kansas Infantry (Colored) by the Fort Scott National Park Service staff
History of the 1st Kansas Infantry (Colored) by the Kansas State Historical Society staff
History of the 1st Kansas Infantry (Colored) by the Museum of the Kansas National Guard
Cool Things - First Kansas Colored Infantry Flag, Kansas Historical Society
Online Exhibits - Keep the Flag to the Front, "The Colored Soldiers," Kansas Historical Society
1st Kansas Colored Infantry (1862-1865) by Semhar Negassa

Military units and formations established in 1862
Military units and formations disestablished in 1864
Units and formations of the Union Army from Kansas
Kansas Infantry, 001
1862 establishments in Kansas
Artillery units and formations of the American Civil War